Catherine Battistone is an American voice actress who has provided voices for several anime titles and video games.

Biography
She is well known for having done the voice of Alpha 6 in the 1997 Power Rangers series, Power Rangers: Turbo.

Battistone has also made minor appearances on-screen, in TV shows including Murder, She Wrote, Simon & Simon, and Tales from the Darkside, and movies including Problem Child.

Personal life
She officially retired from voice acting in 2008.

Selected filmography

Anime
 8 Man After - Sam O'Conner
 Armitage: Dual Matrix - Additional Voices
 Barefoot Gen - Gen Nakaoka
 Crying Freeman - 'Lady' Kimie Hanada
 Dinozaurs - Diamond Ryugu
 Fushigi Yūgi - Taiisukun/Narrator
 Gate Keepers - Youko Ono
 Metal Fighter Miku - Buddhist Nun, Masayo Harajuku
 Outlaw Star - Additional Voices
 Space Adventure Cobra - Sandra
 The Twelve Kingdoms - Circus Master
 Tweeny Witches - Grand Master of Witches
 Vandread - Captain Magno Vivian
 Windaria - Lunarian Queen
 Witch Hunter Robin - Methuselah
 Wolf's Rain - Old Prisoner
 Zenki - Saki Enno

Live-action
 Power Rangers: Turbo - Alpha 6 (voice)
 Power Rangers in Space - Alpha 6 (first episode only, voice)
 Power Rangers: Lightspeed Rescue - Arachnor (voice)
 Power Rangers Time Force - Alpha 6

Video games
 Inherit the Earth: Quest for the Orb
 Jade Cocoon: Story of the Tamamayu
 Lords of Everquest - Additional Voices
 Might and Magic IV: Clouds of Xeen
 Might and Magic V: Darkside of Xeen
 Might and Magic IX
 Star Trek: 25th Anniversary Enhanced - Narrator
 Star Trek: Judgment Rites - Narrator

References

External links
 
 

American voice actresses
Living people
American video game actresses
21st-century American women
Year of birth missing (living people)